William "Bill" Yslas Vélez is an American mathematician, a current Emeritus Professor at the University of Arizona, and an Elected Fellow of the American Association for the Advancement of Science. From 1992–96, Vélez served as the president of Society for the Advancement of Chicanos/Hispanics and Native Americans in Science (SACNAS).

At the University of Arizona he graduated with B.Sc. in 1968, M.Sc. in 1972, and Ph.D. in 1975. His doctoral thesis was written under the supervision of H. B. Mann. Vélez became a Fellow of the American Mathematical Society in January 2013. In 2017, he was selected as a fellow of the Association for Women in Mathematics in the inaugural class.

In 2014, Vélez won the M. Gweneth Humphreys Award of the Association for Women in Mathematics for his mentorship of mathematics students and particularly of women in mathematics.

Notable publications

Patents 
Method and apparatus for suppressing interference from bandspread communication signals, (1996).
Method and apparatus for suppressing linear amplitude interference from bandspread communication signals, (1996).
Simplified interference suppressor, (2000).
Adaptive processor integrator for interference suppression, (2001).

References

Year of birth missing (living people)
Living people
Fellows of the American Association for the Advancement of Science
American mathematicians
University of Arizona faculty
Fellows of the American Mathematical Society
Fellows of the Association for Women in Mathematics